The Argentina women's national softball team is the national team of Argentina. It is governed by the Confederacion Argentina de Softball and takes part in international team handball competitions.

History
The team competed at the 1990 ISF Women's World Championship in Normal, Illinois where they finished with 0 wins and 9 losses.  The team competed at the 1994 ISF Women's World Championship in St. John's, Newfoundland where they finished twenty-second. The team competed at the 2010 ISF Women's World Championship in Caracas, Venezuela where they finished fourteenth. The team won the bronze medal at the 2010 South American Games after they lost to Colombia in the Page playoff system third place match.

References

External links 
 International Softball Federation

Soft
Women's national softball teams
Softball in Argentina